Vulcaniella pomposella is a moth of the family Cosmopterigidae. It is found from France, the Baltic Region and Ukraine to the Mediterranean region.

The wingspan is 8–10 mm. Adults are on wing from the beginning of May to the beginning of July. There are probably two generations per year.

The larvae feed on Helichrysum arenarium and Hieracium pilosella. They mine the leaves of their host plant. They mine the leaf from a silken tube at the leaf underside. Pupation takes place within the mine.

External links
bladmineerders.nl
Fauna Europaea

Vulcaniella
Moths of Europe
Moths of Asia
Moths described in 1839